Frauenburg may refer to the following places:

Frauenburg (castle), in Styria, Austria
the German name of Frombork, Poland
the German exonym for the city of Saldus, Latvia
Unzmarkt-Frauenburg, a municipality in Austria
several castles and abbeys in Germany and Austria